Smart Alliance is an alliance established in 2009 between six Southeast Asian television broadcasting companies: the Philippines' ABS-CBN Corporation, Thailand's BBTV 7, Vietnam's International Media Corporation, Singapore's Mediacorp, Indonesia's Media Nusantara Citra, and Malaysia's Media Prima.

History
On 24 March 2009, six Southeast Asian television broadcasting companies allied to cooperate in three areas — content, sales and marketing, and technology — and capitalize on the economies of scale and combined market that the region can offer. They signed a memorandum of understanding to form the Smart Alliance.

As a region, member countries of the Association of Southeast Asian Nations (ASEAN) alone present a combined market size of more than half a billion viewers and a growing middle-class population with increasingly substantial spending powers. The alliance is well positioned to exploit economies of scale both as a supplier of coveted content as well as a buyer of technology and equipment. For advertisers and clients, the alliance will be able to deliver marketing and promotional solutions on a regional platform.

In March 2010, in celebration of the alliance's first year, Smart Alliance members gathered in Manila, Philippines to formally sign an Equipment and Facilities Lease Agreement, which aims to share facilities among member companies to reduce operating and equipment costs; and an agreement on a website that aims to create an online portal that will provide information about the alliance to various stakeholders. Although not part of their original agenda, the group also signed an agreement formalizing a joint sales package launched by the group according to their goal of boosting regional revenue through jointly led strategies and new target markets to enable the alliance to gain a competitive advantage sustainably

Members
  ABS-CBN Corporation
  Bangkok Broadcasting & Television Company Limited Channel 7 
  International Media Corporation 
  Mediacorp 
  Media Nusantara Citra 
  Media Prima

Key People

Steering Committee
 Chairman
 Lucas Chow
 Members
 Eugenio Lopez III
 Khun Veraphan
 Tim Lam
 Abdul Rahman Ahmad
 Hary Tanoesoedibjo
 Chang Long Jong

Content Work Group
 Leader
 Doreen Neo
 Members
 Linggit Tan
 Sharon Loh
 Farisha Pawanteh
 Rudy Ramawy

Sales & Marketing Work Group
 Leader
 Irene Lim
 Members
 Luis Paolo Pineda
 Sapna Angural
 Shareen Ooi
 Kanti Imansyah

Technology Work Group
 Leader
 Yeo Kim Pow
 Members
 Raul Bulaong
 Tan Kwong Meng
 Agus Mulyanto

References

Supraorganizations
Television organizations
Organizations established in 2009